EGIS-12,233 is a drug with applications in scientific research, acting as a potent and selective antagonist for both the 5-HT6 and 5-HT7 serotonin receptor subtypes, with good selectivity over other receptors. It has been shown to increase dopamine release in cochlear tissue, suggesting a role for the 5-HT6 and 5-HT7 receptors in regulation of the hearing system.

References 

Serotonin receptor antagonists
Phenylpiperazines
Indoles
Lactams
Chloroarenes